Through the Looking-Glass, and What Alice Found There (also known as Alice Through the Looking-Glass or simply Through the Looking-Glass) is a novel published on 27 December 1871 (though indicated as 1872) by Lewis Carroll, a mathematics professor at the University of Oxford, and the sequel to Alice's Adventures in Wonderland (1865). Alice again enters a fantastical world, this time by climbing through a mirror into the world that she can see beyond it. There she finds that, just like a reflection, everything is reversed, including logic (for example, running helps one remain stationary, walking away from something brings one towards it, chessmen are alive, nursery rhyme characters exist, and so on).

Through the Looking-Glass includes such verses as "Jabberwocky" and "The Walrus and the Carpenter", and the episode involving Tweedledum and Tweedledee. The mirror above the fireplace that is displayed at Hetton Lawn in Charlton Kings, Gloucestershire (a house that was owned by Alice Liddell's grandparents, and was regularly visited by Alice and Lewis Carroll) resembles the one drawn by John Tenniel and is cited as a possible inspiration for Carroll.  It prompted a newfound appreciation for its predecessor when it was published.

Plot summary 
Chapter One – Looking-Glass House: Alice is playing with a white kitten (whom she calls "Snowdrop") and a black kitten (whom she calls "Kitty") when she ponders what the world is like on the other side of a mirror's reflection. Climbing up onto the fireplace mantel, she pokes at the wall-hung mirror behind the fireplace and discovers, to her surprise, that she is able to step through it to an alternative world. In this reflected version of her own house, she finds a book with looking-glass poetry, "Jabberwocky", whose reversed printing she can read only by holding it up to the mirror. She also observes that the chess pieces have come to life, though they remain small enough for her to pick up.

Chapter Two – The Garden of Live Flowers: Upon leaving the house (where it had been a cold, snowy night), she enters a sunny spring garden where the flowers can speak; they perceive Alice as being a "flower that can move about". Elsewhere in the garden, Alice meets the Red Queen, who is now human-sized, and who impresses Alice with her ability to run at breathtaking speeds.

Chapter Three – Looking-Glass Insects: The Red Queen reveals to Alice that the entire countryside is laid out in squares, like a gigantic chessboard, and offers to make Alice a queen if she can move all the way to the eighth rank/row in a chess match. Alice is placed in the second rank as one of the White Queen's pawns, and begins her journey across the chessboard by boarding a train that jumps over the third row and directly into the fourth rank, thus acting on the rule that pawns can advance two spaces on their first move. She arrives in a forest where a depressed gnat teaches her about the looking glass insects, strange creatures part bug part object (e.g., bread and butterfly, rocking horse fly), before flying away sadly. Alice continues her journey and along the way, crosses the "wood where things have no names". There she forgets all nouns, including her own name. With the help of a fawn who has also forgotten his identity, she makes it to the other side, where they both remember everything. Realizing that he is a fawn, she is a human, and that fawns are afraid of humans, it runs off (to Alice's frustration).

Chapter Four – Tweedledum and Tweedledee: She then meets the fat twin brothers Tweedledum and Tweedledee, whom she knows from the nursery rhyme. After reciting the long poem "The Walrus and the Carpenter", they draw Alice's attention to the Red King—loudly snoring away under a nearby tree—and maliciously provoke her with idle philosophical banter that she exists only as an imaginary figure in the Red King's dreams. Finally, the brothers begin suiting up for battle, only to be frightened away by an enormous crow, as the nursery rhyme about them predicts.
Chapter Five – Wool and Water: Alice next meets the White Queen, who is very absent-minded but boasts of (and demonstrates) her ability to remember future events before they have happened. Alice and the White Queen advance into the chessboard's fifth rank by crossing over a brook together, but at the very moment of the crossing, the Queen transforms into a talking Sheep in a small shop. Alice soon finds herself struggling to handle the oars of a small rowboat, where the Sheep annoys her with (seemingly) nonsensical shouting about "crabs" and "feathers".

Chapter Six – Humpty Dumpty: After crossing yet another brook into the sixth rank, Alice immediately encounters Humpty Dumpty, who, besides celebrating his unbirthday, provides his own translation of the strange terms in "Jabberwocky". In the process, he introduces Alice to the concept of portmanteau words, before his inevitable fall.

Chapter Seven – The Lion and the Unicorn: "All the king's horses and all the king's men" come to Humpty Dumpty's assistance, and are accompanied by the White King, along with the Lion and the Unicorn, who again proceed to act out a nursery rhyme by fighting with each other. In this chapter, the March Hare and Hatter of the first book make a brief re-appearance in the guise of "Anglo-Saxon messengers" called "Haigha" and "Hatta".

Chapter Eight – "It's my own Invention": Upon leaving the Lion and Unicorn to their fight, Alice reaches the seventh rank by crossing another brook into the forested territory of the Red Knight, who is intent on capturing the "white pawn"—Alice—until the White Knight comes to her rescue. Escorting her through the forest towards the final brook-crossing, the Knight recites a long poem of his own composition called Haddocks' Eyes, and repeatedly falls off his horse.

Chapter Nine – Queen Alice: Bidding farewell to the White Knight, Alice steps across the last brook, and is automatically crowned a queen, with the crown materialising abruptly on her head (a reference to pawn promotion). She soon finds herself in the company of both the White and Red Queens, who relentlessly confound Alice by using word play to thwart her attempts at logical discussion. They then invite one another to a party that will be hosted by the newly crowned Alice—of which Alice herself had no prior knowledge.

Chapter Ten – Shaking: Alice arrives and seats herself at her own party, which quickly turns into chaos. Alice finally grabs the Red Queen, believing her to be responsible for all the day's nonsense, and begins shaking her.

Chapter Eleven – Waking: Alice awakes in her armchair to find herself holding the black kitten, who she deduces to have been the Red Queen all along, with the white kitten having been the White Queen.

Chapter Twelve – Which dreamed it?: The story ends with Alice recalling the speculation of the Tweedle brothers, that everything may have been a dream of the Red King, and that Alice might herself be no more than a figment of his imagination. The book ends with the line "Life, what is it but a dream?"

Characters

Main characters 

 Alice
 March Hare
 The Hatter
 Humpty Dumpty
 Red King
 Red Queen
 The Sheep 
 Tweedledum and Tweedledee
 The Walrus and the Carpenter
 White King
 White Knight
 White Queen
 The Lion and the Unicorn

Minor characters

Symbolism

Mirrors 
One of the key motifs of Through the Looking-Glass is that of mirrors, including the use of opposites, time running backwards, and so on, not to mention the title of the book itself. In fact, the themes and settings of the book make it somewhat of a mirror image to its predecessor, Alice's Adventures in Wonderland (1865). The first book begins in the warm outdoors, on 4 May; uses frequent changes in size as a plot device; and draws on the imagery of playing cards. The second book, however, opens indoors on a snowy, wintry night exactly six months later, on 4 November (the day before Guy Fawkes Night); uses frequent changes in time and spatial directions as a plot device; and draws on the imagery of chess.

Chess 

While the first Alice novel took playing cards as a theme, Through the Looking-Glass instead used chess; most of the main characters are represented by chess pieces, with Alice being a pawn.  The looking-glass world consists of square fields divided by brooks or streams, and the crossing of each brook typically signifies a change in scene, with Alice advancing one square.  At the book's beginning, Carroll provided and explained a chess composition with descriptive notation, corresponding to the events of the story.  Although the piece movements follow the rules of chess, other basic rules are ignored: one player (White) makes several consecutive moves while the (Red/Black) opponent's moves are skipped, and a late check (12... Qe8+) is left undealt with.  Carroll also explained that certain items listed in the composition do not have corresponding piece moves but simply refer to the story, e.g. the "castling of the three Queens, which is merely a way of saying that they entered the palace".  Despite these liberties, the final position is an authentic checkmate.

The most extensive treatment of the chess motif in Carroll's novel was made by Glen Downey in his master's thesis, later expanded and incorporated into his dissertation on the use of chess as a device in Victorian fiction.  In the former piece, Downey gave the composition's moves in algebraic notation: 1... Qh5 2. d4 3. Qc4 4. Qc5 5. d5 6. Qf8 7. d6 8. Qc8 9. d7 Ne7+ 10. Nxe7 11. Nf5 12. d8=Q Qe8+ 13. Qa6 14. Qxe8#.  In the latter piece, Downey treated the 21 items in the composition sequentially, identifying the above 16 coherent chess moves, and another five items as "non-moves" or pure story descriptors, per Carroll's qualification.

The mating position nearly satisfies the conditions of a pure mate, a special type of checkmate where the mated king is prevented from moving to any of the adjacent squares in its field by exactly one enemy attack, among other conditions.  The position is also nearly an ideal mate, a stronger form of pure mate in which every piece on the board of either color contributes to the checkmate.  The one feature of the position which prevents it from being either a pure or an ideal mate is that the Red (Black) King is unable to move to e3 for two reasons: the knight's attack, and the (sustained) attack of the newly promoted, mating queen.  Although pure and ideal mates are "incidental" in real games, they are objects of aesthetic interest to composers of chess problems.

Language 
The White Queen offers to hire Alice as her lady's maid and to pay her "twopence a week, and jam every other day". Alice says that she doesn't want any jam today, to which the Queen replies, "you couldn't have it if you did want it. The rule is, jam tomorrow and jam yesterdaybut never jam to-day." This is a reference to the rule in Latin that the word iam or jam—which means now, in the sense of already or at that time—cannot be used to describe now in the present, which is nunc in Latin. Therefore, "jam" is never available today. This exchange is also a demonstration of the logical fallacy of equivocation.

Poems and songs 

Most poems and songs of the book do not include a title.
 "Introduction" (prelude; "Child of the pure unclouded brow…")
 "Jabberwocky"
 "Tweedledum and Tweedledee"
 "The Walrus and the Carpenter"
 "Humpty Dumpty"
 Humpty Dumpty's poem ("In Winter when the fields are white…")
 "The Lion and the Unicorn"
 "Haddocks' Eyes" (i.e., "A-sitting on a Gate")
 Red Queen's lullaby ("Hush-a-by lady, in Alice's lap…")
 "To the Looking-Glass world it was Alice that said…"
 White Queen's riddle ("'First, the fish must be caught'…")
 "A boat beneath a sunny sky"(postlude; acrostic poem in which putting the beginning letters of each line spell Alice Pleasance Liddell, the girl after whom the book's Alice is named).

The Wasp in a Wig 
Lewis Carroll decided to suppress a scene involving what was described as "a wasp in a wig" (possibly a play on the commonplace expression "bee in the bonnet"). A biography of Carroll, written by Carroll's nephew, Stuart Dodgson Collingwood, suggests that one of the reasons for this suppression was a suggestion from his illustrator, John Tenniel, who wrote in a letter to Carroll dated 1 June 1870:

For many years, no one had any idea what this missing section was or whether it had survived. In 1974, a document purporting to be the galley proofs of the missing section was auctioned at Sotheby's; the catalogue description, in part, read, "the proofs were bought at the sale of the author's…personal effects…Oxford, 1898". The contents were subsequently published in Martin Gardner's More Annotated Alice (1990), and are also available as a hardback book.The rediscovered section describes Alice's encounter with a wasp wearing a yellow wig, and includes a full previously unpublished poem. If included in the book, it would have followed, or been included at the end of, Chapter 8the chapter featuring the encounter with the White Knight. The discovery is generally accepted as genuine, but the proofs have yet to receive any physical examination to establish age and authenticity.

The missing episode was included in the 1998 TV film adaptation Alice through the Looking Glass.

 Dramatic adaptations 

The book has been adapted several times, both in combination with Alice's Adventures in Wonderland and as a stand-alone feature.

 Stand-alone adaptations 

 Alice Through a Looking Glass (1928), a silent movie directed by Walter Lang, would be one of the earliest stand-alone adaptations of the book.
 A dramatised audio-recorded version, directed by Douglas Cleverdon, was released in 1959 by Argo Records. The book is narrated by Margaretta Scott, starring Jane Asher as Alice, along with actors Frank Duncan (Humpty Dumpty, Red King, Frog), Tony Church, Norman Shelley, and Carleton Hobbs.
 Alice Through the Looking Glass (1966) was an NBC TV musical special, first airing on 6 November. The special includes music by Moose Charlap, and stars Ricardo Montalban, Agnes Moorehead, Jack Palance, Jimmy Durante, and the Smothers Brothers, along with Judi Rolin in the role of Alice. 
 Alice Through the Looking Glass (1973) is a BBC TV movie, directed by James MacTaggart and starring Sarah Sutton as Alice. 
 Alice in the Land in the Other Side of the Mirror (1982) is a 38-minute Soviet cutout-animated TV film produced by Kievnauchfilm studio and directed by Yefrem Pruzhanskiy.
 Alice Through the Looking Glass (1987) is an animated TV movie starring Janet Waldo as the voice of Alice, as well as the voices of Mr. T as the Jabberwock, Jonathan Winters, and Phyllis Diller. 
 Alice through the Looking Glass (1998) is a Channel 4 TV movie, starring Kate Beckinsale as the role of Alice, which restored the lost "Wasp in a Wig" episode.
 A 2-hour multimedia stage production (2007), conceived by Andy Burden, was produced by the Tobacco Factory. The show would be directed by Burden and written by Hattie Naylor, with music and lyrics by Paul Dodgson.
 Through the Looking Glass (2008) was a chamber opera composed by Alan John to a libretto by Andrew Upton.
 Alice Through the Looking Glass (2016), directed by James Bobin, is a sequel to the Tim-Burton-directed Disney reboot Alice in Wonderland (2010). It does not follow the plot of the book.
 The BBC Radio 4 show Saturday Drama broadcast an adaptation by Stephen Wyatt on 22 December 2011. The broadcast featured Lewis Carroll, voiced by Julian Rhind-Tutt, as both the narrator and an active character in the story. Other actors include Lauren Mote (Alice), Carole Boyd (Red Queen), Sally Phillips (White Queen), Nicholas Parsons (Humpty-Dumpty), Alistair McGowan (Tweedledum & Tweedledee), and John Rowe (White Knight).

 Adaptations with Alice's Adventures in Wonderland 

 Film and TV 

 Alice in Wonderland (1933) is a pre-code live-action film directed by Norman Z. McLeod, with Charlotte Henry in the role of Alice, along with Cary Grant, Gary Cooper, and others. Despite the title, the film features most elements from Through the Looking Glass as well, including Humpty Dumpty (played by W. C. Fields) and a Harman-Ising animated version of "The Walrus and the Carpenter".
 The animated Alice in Wonderland (1951) is the 13th animated feature film of Walt Disney and the most famous among all direct adaptions of Carroll's work. The film features several elements from Through the Looking-Glass, including the talking flowers, Tweedledee & Tweedledum, and "The Walrus and the Carpenter". 
 Alice's Adventures in Wonderland (1972), a musical film starring Fiona Fullerton as Alice, includes the twins Fred and Frank Cox as Tweedledum & Tweedledee. 
  ("In the World of Alice") is a 1974 Italian TV series that covers both novels, particularly Through the Looking-Glass in episodes 3 and 4.
 Alice in Wonderland (1985) is a two-part TV musical produced by Irwin Allen that covers both books, and stars Natalie Gregory as Alice. In this adaptation, the Jabberwock materialises into reality after Alice reads "Jabberwocky", pursuing her throughout the second half of the musical. 
 Fushigi no Kuni no Arisu (1985) is an anime adaptation of the two novels in which later episodes adhere more closely with Through the Looking Glass.
 Alice in Wonderland (1999), a made-for-TV Hallmark/NBC film with Tina Majorino as Alice, uses elements from Through the Looking Glass, such as the talking flowers, Tweedledee & Tweedledum, and "The Walrus and the Carpenter", as well as the chess theme, including the snoring Red King and White Knight. 
 Alice (2009) is a Syfy TV miniseries that contains elements from both novels.
 Alice in Wonderland (2010), directed by Tim Burton, is a live-action Disney reboot that follows Alice at an adult age, containing elements from both books.

 Stage productions 

 
 Alice in Concert (1980), also known as Alice at the Palace, was a production written and produced by Elizabeth Swados. Performed on a bare stage, the production starred Meryl Streep in the role of Alice, with additional supporting cast by Mark Linn-Baker and Betty Aberlin.
 Lookingglass Alice (2007) was an acrobatic interpretation of both novels, produced by the Lookingglass Theater Company, that performed in New York City, Philadelphia, and Chicago, with a version of the show touring the rest of the United States.
 A 2-part production by Iris Theatre in London was staged in the summer of 2013, in which the second part consisted of Through the Looking-Glass. Both parts included Laura Wickham in the role of Alice.
 Alice (2010), written by Laura Wade, was a modern adaptation of both books that premiered at the Crucible Theatre in Sheffield in 2010.
 Wonder.land (2015), a live musical by Moira Buffini and Damon Albarn, takes some characters from the second novel, notably Dum and Dee and Humpty Dumpty, while the Queen of Hearts and the Red Queen are merged into one character.
 Alice in Wonderland and Through the Looking-Glass (2001) was a stage adaption by Adrian Mitchell for the Royal Shakespeare Company, in which the second act consists of Through the Looking-Glass. Alice's Adventures Under Ground (2020), a one-act opera written in 2016 by Gerald Barry and first staged at the Royal Opera House, is a conflation of the two novels.
 Looking-Glass, a 1982 Off-Broadway play based on Charles Dodgson, the real-life name of author Lewis Carroll 
 Other Jabberwocky (1977) is a film that expands the story of the poem "Jabberwocky".Thru the Mirror (1936) is a Mickey Mouse short film in which Mickey travels through his mirror and into a bizarre world.Donald in Mathmagic Land (1959) is a film that includes a segment with Donald Duck dressed as Alice meeting the Red Queen on a chessboard.American McGee's Alice (2000) is a computer game in which the player takes the role of a teenage Alice fighting to reclaim her sanity. It was followed by a sequel, Alice: Madness Returns, in 2011.Through the Looking-Glass (2011) was a ballet by American composer John Craton.Through the Zombie Glass'' (2013) is a book by Gena Showalter.

See also 

 Alice Chess
 "I Am the Walrus"
 Translations of Alice's Adventures in Wonderland
 Translations of Through the Looking-Glass
 Vorpal sword
 Works based on Alice in Wonderland

References

Footnotes

Citations

Other sources

External links 
 
 
 A catalogue of illustrated editions of the Alice books from 1899 to 2009

Online texts
 
 
 
 

Alice's Adventures in Wonderland
1872 British novels
1870s children's books
1872 fantasy novels
 British children's books
Victorian novels
Children's fantasy novels
British children's novels
Works by Lewis Carroll
Books illustrated by John Tenniel
Macmillan Publishers books
Sequel novels
Novels about chess
Surreal comedy
British novels adapted into films
British novels adapted into television shows
1872 in the United Kingdom
Novels set in fictional countries